Farex is a food for babies and infants made primarily from rice flour and enriched with vitamins.  It was produced by the company Heinz.

About
Farex baby cereal was first produced by the company Glaxo in 1934.  Today, Farex is one of the most popular foods for babies in Australia and New Zealand. Farex now offers cereals for different ages.

References

Infant feeding
Heinz brands